St. Louis University High School (SLUH) is a Jesuit Catholic high school for boys. Founded in 1818, it is the oldest secondary educational institution in the U.S. west of the Mississippi River, and one of the largest private high schools in Missouri. It is located in the Archdiocese of St. Louis.

History
SLUH was founded in 1818 by the bishop of St. Louis, Bishop Dubourg, as a Latin school for boys known as St. Louis Academy. Classes were held in a one-story house owned by Madame Alvarez on the northwest corner of Third and Market Street. It quickly grew to include a college division, and the college was granted university status in 1832. The high school retained the identity of St. Louis Academy on the university campus until 1924 when it moved to its own facilities and incorporated separately under the name of St. Louis University High School. The school's new home, on Oakland Avenue, was a gift of Anna Backer in memory of her late husband and alumnus George Backer. That facility, also known as Backer Memorial, has grown considerably over the years and remains the school's home.

The high school integrated when it enrolled John Carter, a sophomore transfer from Saint Thomas Academy in St. Paul, Minnesota, in 1946, one year before Cardinal Joseph Ritter issued a pastoral letter desegregating all Catholic schools in the St. Louis Archdiocese. Carter did not graduate from the school: the honor of the first Black graduate of SLUH fell to Al Thomas, also a sophomore transfer and a member of the class of 1950, while the first four-year Black graduate was Eldridge Morgan, a member of the class of 1951.

In 1984, Paul Owens became the school's first lay principal, Dr. Mary Schenkenberg became its first female principal in 2002, and in 2005 David J. Laughlin was hired as the school's first lay president.

In each year from 2013 to 2016, SLUH was named among the top-scoring organizations in the mid-size employer category of the St. Louis Post-Dispatch's survey of Top Workplaces.

Academics
Since the school is part of the Jesuit network that consists of 61 high schools and 28 colleges and universities in the United States, SLUH provides an education infused with the tradition and philosophy of St. Ignatius of Loyola.  Theology and philosophy classes are conducted daily.

According to figures released on SLUH's website in 2011, the median ACT score for SLUH students is over 30. By composite score, it ranks among the top 7% of schools in the United States.  Over 50% of SLUH's class of 2011 achieved a score of 30 or higher on the ACT. Among St. Louis and St. Louis area high schools with a total enrollment of over 600, it had the highest scores in 2012. Since 2005 a total of 31 students have received a 36, the highest score possible.  Four members of the class of 2012 achieved this score, along with five members of the class of 2013, and two members of the class of 2014.

In 2010, 23 students from SLUH were named National Merit Scholarship Program Semifinalists, more than any other school in Missouri.  In 2011, 17 students were named Semifinalists, while 28 were named National Merit Commended Scholars. In 2012, 25 students were named Semifinalists, while 29 were named Commended Scholars.

Advanced Placement (AP) courses have been offered through SLUH for half a century.  AP courses are now offered for 22 disciplines.  In 2010, 345 students took 790 AP exams. Eighty-seven percent scored a 3, 4 or 5, grades that qualify them for college credit.

SLUH has also performed well in the Presidential Scholars Program.  In 2007, for example, three of Missouri's ten semifinalists were from SLUH, with one, Daniel Viox, receiving one of the two scholarships awarded. In 2012, one of Missouri's ten semifinalists was from SLUH.

The humanities are emphasized in SLUH's curriculum. The language department has offered four-year programs in Russian and Chinese since 1964.  In 1997, a student exchange program with the Nanjing Foreign Language School was established. Since 2011, SLUH has sponsored a Confucius Classroom which is a subdivision of Webster University's Confucius Institute.  In 1999, educational exchange programs for the study of Russian language and culture were established with schools in St. Petersburg. In keeping with its strong Jesuit Catholic heritage, courses in Latin and Greek are offered, as are the popular choices of French, Spanish, Arabic, and Chinese.  SLUH also has strong programs in the natural sciences, mathematics, computer science, social sciences, fine arts, and literature.

Virtually all SLUH students immediately enter colleges or universities upon graduation.  Members of the Class of 2011 were accepted at 203 colleges and universities and attended 72 of them. These students accepted more than 300 scholarships totaling nearly $2 million.

In The Washington Post's 2015 ranking of America's Most Challenging High Schools, SLUH was ranked among the top three in Missouri and the top 1.5% nationwide. In the Post's 2016 ranking, SLUH was ranked among the top 1.2% nationwide. The United States Department of Education's National Blue Ribbon Schools Program recognized SLUH as an Exemplary High Performing National Blue Ribbon School for 2015. In 2016, Niche ranked SLUH as the 19th-best All-Boys high school in the US.

Facilities
The first major reconstruction of the SLUH campus came in the 1980s, when then-principal Fr. Thomas Cummings, S.J. began the "E-3" campaign. This was highlighted by the construction of the Robertson Library and the development of property fronting Oakland Avenue, including the football stadium and upper parking lot. Development continued in the 1990s with the inauguration of the performing arts wing highlighted by a 610-seat theater, named after longtime drama teacher Joseph Schulte in the 2000s. Previously the school auditorium/theater had been located within the main school building, and its move allowed for a large expansion of classrooms and office space. The Jesuits also moved out of the Backer Memorial building around this time and into nearby houses the school purchased: the "J-wing" then became home to the theology department, several classrooms, and the administrative offices.

In the late 1990s, a large capital campaign to fund growth and expansion projects began under Fr. Paul Sheridan, S.J. Called Vision 2000 (V2K), the $32 million plan included reducing class sizes, better integrating technology into the curriculum, and increasing class options.

The early phases of the program included the addition of new teaching and counseling positions in order to reduce class size and teaching loads and to expand the curriculum. Over eight years, 18 new teaching and counseling positions were added.

The physical improvements began in 2004 when the football stadium was given artificial turf and a new entry boulevard to the west of the campus was constructed jointly with the adjacent St. Louis Science Center, along with a new shared parking facility. The construction continued with the addition of a 17-acre soccer–track complex and Sheridan Stadium, a new baseball field.

In 2009 SLUH completed the Danis Field House, a free-standing field house that contains two gymnasium spaces, a wrestling room, offices and meeting space for the athletic staff, and locker facilities. The old gym was converted into the Si Commons, a multipurpose event space that serves as a new cafeteria during school hours. A new school entrance was also built and the campus bookstore moved from the basement pool hall to the new foyer. The old cafeteria remained largely unused until 2022, when the administrative and counseling offices moved into the re-christened Dill Center for Academic Success. This was the centerpiece of a new capital campaign entitled "Go Forth", which raised more than $72 million and included comprehensive upgrades to school curriculum and partnerships, the purchase of a retreat center in western St. Louis County, and the establishment of merit-based financial awards.

One of the more unique elements of the school is its basement: since the 1940s, it has played host to a large pool hall and recreation room. In addition to more than 40 pool tables, it offers foosball, bar shuffleboard, bubble hockey and table tennis, as well as a snack bar. Students can check out equipment for free, but if one were to drop a billiard ball on the floor, they are traditionally fined 5 cents—thus, the cry of "Nickel!" when the distinctive sound of ivory hitting cement is heard. The basement also features a weight room and functional training center built as part of the V2K renovations, rifle range (home to the school's champion target shooting squad, with open range time available after school for a small fee), computer labs, and a robotics lab/makerspace.

Activities
SLUH is competitive in many academic events such as math contests, Math League, Speech Team, Mock Trial and Quizbowl (Academic Team). SLUH was the top-scoring high school in the Missouri chapter of Math League for five years running. The Quizbowl team of 2006-07 won the district title and second place at the state competition along with the individual second place medal.

Sports and rivalries
SLUH's athletic teams are known as the Junior Billikens, or Jr. Bills. Their rivals are Christian Brothers College High School.  They compete in the Metro Catholic Conference. In Missouri state competition (MSHSAA), they compete at the largest classification and have won many state championships, including the following: water polo 22 times, basketball four times (1946, 1952, 1958, 1961), soccer four times (1972, 1990, 1995, 2003), tennis three times (1970, 1981, 2006), ice hockey four times (2013, 2018, 2019, 2022), swimming and diving three times (1956, 2003, 2018), cross country five times (1961, 1999, 2009, 2012, 2013), golf once, track and field once (2006), football once (1970), lacrosse once (2009), volleyball five times (2003, 2007, 2008, 2015, 2016). In addition, they field teams in multiple other sports such as racquetball, target shooting, inline hockey, rugby union, and ultimate frisbee.

Notable alumni

Business 
 Timothy J. Danis - businessman, founder of RCP Advisors
 John T. Schuessler, former CEO and chairman of the board of Wendy's International, Inc.

Clergy

 William S. Bowdern, S.J., conducted an exorcism, some details of which were portrayed in William Peter Blatty's novel The Exorcist, as well as in the movie based upon that novel. In the movie Possessed, Timothy Dalton played the role of Fr. Bowdern.
 Michael J. Sheridan, bishop of the Roman Catholic Diocese of Colorado Springs.
 David Francis Hickey, bishop of the Roman Catholic Diocese of Belize.

Entertainment
 Michael Buegg, film producer known for La La Land, Up in the Air and Little Miss Sunshine
 Jim Byrnes, actor and musician, appointed as the Order of Canada in 2022
 Dave Giuntoli, actor and star of NBC's Grimm.
 James Gunn, filmmaker and screenwriter.
 Matt Gunn, writer for HBO show Real Time with Bill Maher.
 Sean Gunn, actor.
 Mark Gunn, writer.
 Brian Gunn, writer.
 George Hickenlooper, filmmaker.
 Ken Kwapis, film and TV director.
 Dan Potthast, ska musician and member of MU330, named after the class in which its constituents met.

Government
 John E. Bardgett, Missouri Supreme Court justice.
 Terrence L. Bracy, former Assistant United States Secretary of Transportation under President Jimmy Carter.
 Alfonso J. Cervantes, former mayor of St. Louis.
 Joseph Darst, former mayor of St. Louis.
 The Hon. Edward L. Filippine, United States federal judge.
 Raymond Gruender, federal judge on the United States Court of Appeals for the Eighth Circuit.
 Daniel Isom, former St. Louis City Chief of Police.
 Tim Jones (politician), former Majority Leader and Speaker of the House in the Missouri House of Representatives
 Chris Koster, Missouri Attorney General.
 F. William McCalpin, attorney known as a strong advocate for legal services for the poor.
 Bryan Mullanphy, former mayor of St. Louis.
 Stephen Murphy III, federal trial judge and former United States Attorney, Eastern Michigan, Detroit.
 Bob Onder, state senator of Missouri.
 Mel Price, former U.S. Congressmen from southern Illinois.
 William F. Quinn, first governor of the state of Hawaii, and former president of Dole Food Company.
 Eugene R. Sullivan, former chief judge of the U.S. Court of Appeals (Armed Forces), counsel on Richard Nixon's defense team during the Senate Watergate hearings, and governor of Wake Island.
 Raymond Tucker, former mayor of St. Louis.  Also, former chair of mechanical engineering at Washington University in St. Louis.
 Buzz Westfall, St. Louis County, County Executive, 1990–2003.

Historical
 Jean Baptiste Charbonneau, son of Sacagawea and Toussaint Charbonneau, members of The Corps of Discovery/Lewis and Clark Expedition, pictured as an infant on the U.S. One Dollar Coin.

Humanitarianism/activism
 Thomas Anthony Dooley III, humanitarian, medical doctor, activist, author and Congressional Gold Medal recipient.
 Henry Hampton, Civil Rights Movement activist, recipient of the Heinz Award, filmmaker (Eyes on the Prize).
 E. Michael Harrington, Harvard professor, author, and founder of the Democratic Socialists of America.
 Max Starkloff, disability rights activist and founder of Paraquad.

Journalism
 Greg Burke, journalist and director of the Holy See Press Office.
 Robert Hyland, radio executive at KMOX who created the talk radio format.
 George Michael, sportscaster for The George Michael Sports Machine.
 Nicholas Fandos, journalist for The New York Times.

Military
 Michael Blassie, former unknown soldier for Vietnam War.

Scholars, scientists, and inventors
 Joseph L. Badaracco, chaired professor of business ethics at Harvard University.
 Gary Gutting, holder of endowed chair in philosophy at the University of Notre Dame.
 Hubert Schlafly, co-inventor of the teleprompter.
 Robert J. Scherrer, theoretical physicist at Vanderbilt University.
 Keith Schwab, quantum physicist and head of Schwab Research Group at Caltech.
 Kevin Slattery, led implementation of first metal additive manufactured parts in aerospace, and holder of 39 patents.

Sports
 Ray Bluth, professional bowler.
 Nelson Burton Jr., professional bowler.
 Buzz Demling, professional soccer player and former member of the U.S. Men's National Soccer Team.
 Joe Germanese, former Major League Soccer player.
 Cole Grossman, Major League Soccer player.
 Henry Jones, former All-Pro defensive back for the Buffalo Bills.
 Bob Kehoe, soccer player and former head coach of the U.S. Men's National Soccer Team.
 William "Ty" Keough, sports broadcaster, retired professional soccer player and former member of the U.S. Men's National Soccer Team.
 Ed Macauley, professional basketball player and member of the Basketball Hall of Fame.
 Pat McBride, professional soccer player and member of the national soccer hall of fame.
 Tommy Meyer, professional soccer player for the Los Angeles Galaxy.
 Ken Sanders, professional baseball player.
 Joe Schultz, professional baseball player and manager.
 Hank Raymonds, Marquette University basketball coach (1961–1983).
 Frank Simek, member of U.S. Men's National Soccer Team.
 Matt Sinclair, former NFL professional football player.
 Luis Soffner, Major League Soccer goalkeeper.
 Taylor Twellman, Major League Soccer player, member of U.S. Men's National Soccer Team.
 Ronnie Wingo, NFL and CFL running back.
 Tony Adams, NFL defensive back for the New York Jets.

Faculty
 Charles "Dismas" Clark, taught mathematics and served as an administrator at SLUH during the 1930s.  After returning from service as an army chaplain during WWII, he became an advocate of prison reform and rehabilitation.  In 1959 he founded Dismas House, the first half-way house for parolees and former prisoners in the United States.  The Hoodlum Priest, a film about Clark, was made in 1961. Don Murray played the role of "Dismas" Clark.
 Erwin Claggett, former Saint Louis University basketball player and head coach of SLUH basketball team.
 Pierre-Jean De Smet, taught at the school in its early history.
 Walter Halloran taught at SLUH during the 1970s.  Prior to that he earned two Bronze Stars while serving as a paratrooper chaplain during the Vietnam War.  In 1949 he assisted William S. Bowdern with what has since become a famous case of exorcism.
 Robert J. Henle S.J., served as president of Georgetown University (1969-1976) and served as a professor at Saint Louis University for several decades. He taught classics at SLUH
 Mike Jones, NFL football player and SLUH head football coach.
 John Knoepfle, English teacher; later a poet, translator, and university professor
 Hank Raymonds '42, coached basketball at SLUH from 1950-55.

See also
 Saint Louis University

References

External links
 
 Prep News

Boys' schools in Missouri
Educational institutions established in 1818
Jesuit high schools in the United States
Roman Catholic secondary schools in St. Louis
Roman Catholic Archdiocese of St. Louis
1818 establishments in Missouri Territory
Buildings and structures in St. Louis